Panchrysia v-argenteum is a moth of the family Noctuidae. It is found in the Carpathian mountains, Dalmatia, the Alps and Greece. The species is found high altitudes of up to 1,400 meters.

The wingspan is 36–44 mm. The moth flies from May to September depending on the location.

The larvae feed on the leaves of a wide range of plants, including Thalictrum and Isopyrum thalictroides.

Subpspecies
There are two recognised subspecies:
Panchrysia v-argenteum v-argenteum (Alps)
Panchrysia v-argenteum pantheon (Greece)

External links

Panchrysia on Funet Taxonomy
Fauna Europaea
www.lepiforum.de
www.schmetterlinge-deutschlands.de 

Plusiini
Moths of Europe
Moths described in 1798
Taxa named by Eugenius Johann Christoph Esper